Mehmet Gürs (born 13 December 1969) is a Finnish-Turkish celebrity chef, television personality and restaurateur. He is considered to be Istanbul's most recognizable chef.

Biography
Gürs was born in Finland to a Turkish father and a Finnish-Swedish mother and grew up in Stockholm and Istanbul. He spent eight years training and working as a chef in the United States; from 1990 to 1993 he studied Hotel, Restaurant and Institutional Management at Johnson & Wales University. In the mid 1990s, he returned to Turkey to start his first restaurant called Downtown; six years later he opened Lokanta and then Mikla in 2005.

Gürs's Istanbul Food & Beverage Group now consists of Mikla, the numnum café & restaurant, Trattoria Enzo, Kronotrop, Terra Kitchen chain and the group's research lab, the workshop.

Awards
2001: Best Restaurant/ Downtown - TimeOut Istanbul
2002: Best Bar/ NuTeras - TimeOut Istanbul
2003: Best Chef/Mehmet Gürs - TimeOut Istanbul
2004: Best Bar/ NuTeras - TimeOut Istanbul
2006: Best Restaurant/ Mikla - TimeOut Istanbul

Personal life
Gürs has one child. He speaks Swedish, Turkish, French, and English.

References

External links

Official website

Turkish television chefs
Turkish people of Finnish descent
Johnson & Wales University alumni
Living people
1969 births
Finnish television chefs
Finnish expatriates in Sweden
Finnish expatriates in the United States
Finnish people of Turkish descent
Turkish expatriates in Sweden
Turkish expatriates in the United States